Forlidas Ridge is a rock ridge that forms the west side of Davis Valley in the Dufek Massif, Pensacola Mountains, Antarctica. It was mapped by the United States Geological Survey from surveys and U.S. Navy air photos, 1956–66, and was named by the Advisory Committee on Antarctic Names after Charles W. Forlidas, a radioman with the Ellsworth Station winter party, 1957.

References 

Ridges of Queen Elizabeth Land